Buckfast is a village near Buckfastleigh, Teignbridge, Devon, England

Buckfast may also refer to:
 Buckfast Tonic Wine, a fortified wine originally made at Buckfast Abbey
 Buckfast bee, a bee bred by members of the Federation of European Buckfast Beekeepers 
 Buckfastleigh, a town in Devon, England